José Manuel da Cunha Faro Menezes Portugal da Gama Carneiro e Sousa (12 January 1788 - 24 October 1849) was a Portuguese count and the President of the Council of Ministers from 10 September to 4 November 1836. He was the 4th Count of Lumiares.

References

1788 births
1849 deaths
Naval ministers of Portugal
People from Lisbon
19th-century Portuguese people
Counts of Portugal
Prime Ministers of Portugal